Qianjiang District, formerly Qianjiang Tujia and Miao Autonomous County, is a district (formerly an autonomous county), in the southeastern part of Chongqing, China, bordering Hubei province to the east and northeast. While it is governed as a district, in practice Qianjiang is its own city proper far removed from the urban centre of Chongqing. Qianjiang is nicknamed "The Throat of Sichuan and Hubei" because it sits on the intersection of Sichuan-Hubei and Sichuan-Hunan Roads.

Qianjiang District has a permanent population of 487,281, per the 2020 Chinese Census, the majority of which is ethnically Tujia. The district is also home to large Han Chinese and Miao populations, which comprise about 30% and 15% of the district's population, respectively.

History
According to the district government, humanoid activity in the region date back to approximately 600,000 years ago.

The district government claims the area was incorporated into the Xia dynasty as Liang Prefecture.

The area was home to a variety of different ethnic groups at the time.

In 140 BCE, during the Western Han period,  was established under the Ba Commandery. Fuling County's government was seated in present-day , and the county governed over much of present-day Chongqing and northeast Guizhou. Circa 106 BCE, Liang Prefecture was reorganized as Yi Province, which now governed the area.

Danxing County, which survived up through the Northern and Southern dynasties period, had its county seat in present-day  in Qianjiang District. However, local administrative units often held little de facto power, as, for the next two centuries, local leaders of different ethnic groups raised local militias to promote their own interests. In 565 CE, local ethnic leader Tian Sihe, effectively incorporated much of the land in the area into the Northern Zhou.

In 585 CE (during the Sui dynasty), Danxing County was reorganized as Shicheng County, which belonged to Yong Prefecture, with the district seat at today's Ba Village of Baxiang County. Due to the recent establishment of a number of other counties in the area, the territory governed by Shicheng County was relatively small, and the county was merged into Pengshui County, which was governed by Qi Prefecture, in 607 CE. Yong Prefecture was replaced by Badong Commandery.

Tang dynasty 
In 618 CE, during the Tang dynasty, Shicheng County was re-established and became part of Qian Prefecture. The county's seat was Wuci Town. Shortly after, Qian Prefecture was abolished, and the area was reorganized as Qianzhong Commandery, which governed over five counties: Pengshui County (same name as the previous iteration), Hongdu County, Yangshui County, Yongning County (same name as the previous iteration), and Shicheng County. In 630 CE, Shicheng's county seat moved back to Nanmuping. In 742 CE, Shicheng County was changed to Qianjiang County, and put under the jurisdiction of An Commandry.

Song dynasty and Yuan dynasty 
From 960 to 1368 (Song and Yuan), Qianjiang at this time was "half-barbarian" and dominated by the local rich bourgeois of the Gongs, Hus, Qins, and Xiangs according to the Qianjiang County Records of the Qing Dynasty.

In 1285 (late Yuan), Qianjiang was part of Ming Yuzhen's Daxia Empire.

Ming dynasty 
In 1372, Qianjiang County was merged into nearby Pengshui County. In 1378, 1216 soldiers were dispatched here to guard the place. Qianjiang County was re-established in 1381.

Qing dynasty 
In early Qing, Qianjiang District was under Chongqing Subprefecture. In 1726, Qianjiang County was reorganized as a subprefecture.

Republic of China 
In 1912, Qianjiang County was under Liuxiang Fangqu. From 1927 to 1935, the county was directly governed by the Sichuan government. In 1935, Qianjiang County was placed under the jurisdiction of the Eighth Administrative Region of Sichuan Province, also known as Youyang Special District. The county seat was at Sanduo Town.

People's Republic of China 
On November 12, 1949, Qianjiang came under CPC control, and the People's Government was established on November 25, as part of Chuandong Administrative Special District. The county seat changed to Lianhe Town. On January 23, 1950, the county was reorganized under Youyang Prefecture, which also administered Youyang and Xiushan Counties. In September 1952, Youyang was merged into , which later became a second  (same English translation, different Chinese characters).

On November 14, 1983, the State Council approved changing Qianjiang County to Qianjiang Tujia and Miao Autonomous County, reflecting the area's large Tujia and Miao population. The assembly was established November 13 of the following year.

On May 18, 1988, the State Council halved Fuling, reorganizing Qianjiang County, as well as four other counties (5 autonomous counties of Fuling's 10 counties), into a new prefecture: Qianjiang Prefecture. The other four counties were:
 Shizhu Tujia Autonomous County
 Pengshui Miao and Tujia Autonomous County
 Youyang Tujia and Miao Autonomous County
 Xiushan Tujia and Miao Autonomous County

The prefecture officially began in November.

Qianjiang County, along with Qianjiang District, was incorporated into Chongqing Municipality in 1997. In 1998, the prefecture was changed to the Qianjiang Development Area, which governs Shizhu, Xiushan, Qianjiang County, Pengshui and Youyang on behalf of Chongqing. On May 22, 1998 (implemented June 2000), Qianjiang Development Area and Qianjiang Autonomous County were abolished. In June 2000, Qianjiang Autonomous County and the Qianjiang Development Area were abolished, and became Qianjing District, directly administered by Chongqing. Shizhu, Xiushan, Pengshui and Youyang remain autonomous counties, and are governed by Chonqging directly as well. Prior to becoming a district, Qianjiang had governed  5 towns, 45 townships, 8 neighborhood committees, and 517 village committees. Many townships were abolished, the only abolished town was Lianhe, the old county seat now separated into sub-districts.

As of 2001, the district contained 3 sub-districts, 12 townships, 15 towns, and 489 village committees.

Administrative divisions
Currently, Qianjiang District administers 6 subdistricts, 15 towns, and 9 townships.

Climate

Demographics 

According the 2020 Chinese Census, there are 487,281 permanent residents in the district, a 9.50% increase from the 2010 Chinese Census. The 2020 Census reported 176,443 household units in the district, of which, 170,310 households are familial, and the other 6,133 are non-familial households. 457,711 people in the district live in familial households, and 29,570 people live in non-familial households.

Ethnic groups 
As of 2020, 55.11% of Qianjiang District is ethnically Tujia, 29.27% is Han Chinese, 15.19% is Miao, and the remaining 0.43% belonging to 24 various other ethnic minorities. From 2010 to 2020, the district's Han Chinese population grew by 20.04%, the Miao population grew by 6.39%, the Tujia population grew 4.80%, and the population belonging to other ethnic groups grew 459.79%.

Transport
Qianjiang is located on the border between Chongqing Municipality and Hubei and Hunan provinces. The G65 Baotou–Maoming Expressway connects Qianjiang with the Chongqing city proper to the west and the city of Huaihua to the southeast. On G65, the drive to Chongqing city proper could take more than four hours. China National Highway 319 also runs through Qianjiang.

Qianjiang is served by the Qianjiang Wulingshan Airport, a regional airport with connections to Chongqing, Beijing, Guangzhou, Chengdu, and Kunming.

References

External links
 Official site (in Simplified Chinese)

Districts of Chongqing